Meryl Davis (born January 1, 1987) is a former competitive American ice dancer. With partner Charlie White, she is the 2014 Olympic champion, the 2010 Olympic silver medalist, a two-time (2011, 2013) World champion, five-time Grand Prix Final champion (2009–2013), three-time Four Continents champion (2009, 2011, 2013) and six-time U.S. national champion (2009–2014). They also won a bronze medal in the team event at the 2014 Winter Olympics.

Davis and White teamed up in 1997 and they are currently the longest lasting dance team in the United States. They are the first American ice dancers to win the World title, as well as the first Americans to win the Olympic title. At the 2006 NHK Trophy, they became the first ice dancing team to earn level fours on all their elements.

In 2014, Davis won the eighteenth season of Dancing with the Stars with partner Maksim Chmerkovskiy.

Personal life
Meryl Davis was born in Royal Oak, Michigan and raised in West Bloomfield Township, Michigan, the daughter of Cheryl and Paul D. Davis.  She has one younger brother, Clayton. She is of English, Irish, Scottish and German descent. Her paternal grandmother was born in Regina, Saskatchewan. Davis has difficulty seeing out of her right eye and lacks depth perception. She was diagnosed with dyslexia in the third grade and she struggled with reading until the 11th grade. In June 2005, Davis graduated from Wylie E. Groves High School.

Davis previously lived in Birmingham, Michigan. She attended the University of Michigan, where she majored in cultural anthropology and also studied Italian. She was an active member of the sorority Delta Delta Delta and plays the flute. Davis joined UNICEF Kid Power as a brand ambassador in March 2016.

On July 13, 2017, Davis became engaged to former figure skater Fedor Andreev, whom she had been dating for over six years. They married in Provence, France, in June 2019.

Career

Early career
She began skating at age five on a local lake in the winter. Due to her vision problems, Davis often hugged the boards when she first started skating. She started out as a single skater, but began doing ice dance at age eight. She got as high as Midwestern sectionals in novice ladies before quitting singles to focus on ice dancing.

She was teamed up with Charlie White by her coach, Seth Chafetz, in 1997.  In 2009, Davis said: "Charlie and I grew up 10 minutes apart from each other. Our parents are best friends. We've grown together and know each other so well."

In their first season together, Davis/White won the silver medal at the Junior Olympics in the Juvenile division. In 1999–00, they won gold at the Junior Olympics on the intermediate level. In the 2000–01 season, they qualified for the 2001 U.S. Championships, placing 6th as Novices. In 2001–02, they won the silver medal as novices and then moved up to the junior level.  In the 2002–03 season, they did not win a medal at either of their two Junior Grand Prix assignments and placed 7th at the 2003 U.S. Championships in their junior debut.

Junior career
In the 2003–2004 season, Davis/White won their sectional championship and then won the junior silver medal at Nationals. This earned them a trip to the 2004 Junior Worlds, where they placed 13th.

In the 2004–2005 season, Davis/White won two bronze medals on the ISU Junior Grand Prix series. However, White broke his ankle before Sectionals and so Davis/White were unable to qualify for the 2005 U.S. Championships. Their season ended there.

In the 2005–2006 season, Davis/White medaled at both their Junior Grand Prix events and placed second at the Junior Grand Prix Final. They won the junior national title at the 2006 U.S. Championships and then won the bronze medal at the 2006 Junior Worlds. Following that season, Davis aged out of Juniors. They lost some training time after White broke his ankle at a hockey tournament in 2006.

Senior career

Post-competitive career
Davis and White continue to perform together in ice shows. On February 23, 2017, they confirmed that they would not return to competition.

Programs

Competitive highlights
(with White)

Detailed results
(with White)

Dancing with the Stars
On March 4, 2014, Davis was announced as one of the contestants on the 18th season of Dancing with the Stars paired with professional dancer Maksim Chmerkovskiy. She competed against her skating partner, Charlie White, who was also cast to take part on the 18th season of the show.
On May 20, 2014, Davis and Chmerkovskiy were declared the season's champions. Davis currently has the highest celebrity average of 28.4 out of all the seasons based on the 30 point system and once tied with actresses Jennifer Grey and Rumer Willis for the record of the most perfect scores rewarded, with 6 (which is now held by Jordan Fisher with 9).

Dancing with the Stars performances

1Score given by guest judge Robin Roberts.

2For this week only, as part of the "Partner Switch-Up" week, Davis did not perform with Maksim Chmerkovskiy, and instead performed with Valentin Chmerkovskiy.

3Score given by guest judge Julianne Hough.

4 Score given by guest judge Donny Osmond.

5 Score given by guest judge Redfoo.

6 Score given by guest judge Ricky Martin.

7 Score given by guest judge Abby Lee Miller.

8 Score given by guest judge Kenny Ortega.

References

External links

 
 
 Meryl Davis / Charlie White  at IceNetwork
 
 
 
 - 1998 Juvenile silver medalists

1987 births
Living people
American female ice dancers
American people of Canadian descent
American people of English descent
American people of German descent
American people of Irish descent
American people of Scottish descent
Dancing with the Stars (American TV series) winners
Figure skaters at the 2010 Winter Olympics
Figure skaters at the 2014 Winter Olympics
Four Continents Figure Skating Championships medalists
Medalists at the 2010 Winter Olympics
Medalists at the 2014 Winter Olympics
Olympic bronze medalists for the United States in figure skating
Olympic gold medalists for the United States in figure skating
Olympic silver medalists for the United States in figure skating
Season-end world number one figure skaters
Season's world number one figure skaters
Sportspeople from Royal Oak, Michigan
University of Michigan College of Literature, Science, and the Arts alumni
World Figure Skating Championships medalists
World Junior Figure Skating Championships medalists
People from West Bloomfield, Michigan
21st-century American women